Sergei Gavrilovich Navashin; (14 December 1857 – 10 December 1930) was a Russian and Soviet biologist. He discovered double fertilization in plants in 1898.

Biography 
1874 — enters  the Medical Surgical Academy in St. Petersburg, works on chemistry in the laboratory of A. Borodin

1878 — moves to the Moscow University, obtains Candidate degree in 1881 in Biology. Under the influence of K. Timiryazev and V. Zinger starts to study Botany. Receives a position of a laboratory assistant at the chair of Plant Physiology and later (1885) in the Petrovskaya Agricultural Academy.

1894 — is invited to work at the chair of Systematics and Morphology of the Kiev University.

During 1894-1914 works as a director of the Botanical Garden of Kiev University

1896 — defends his doctoral thesis at Odessa University

1918-1923—professor of Tbilisi University (Georgia)

1923—founds the Timiryazev Biological Institute in Moscow. Heads it till 1929.

References

External links
 Sergei Gavrilovich Navashin at www.cybertruffle.org.uk

1857 births
1930 deaths
Russian biologists
Corresponding members of the Saint Petersburg Academy of Sciences
Full Members of the Russian Academy of Sciences (1917–1925)
Full Members of the USSR Academy of Sciences
Members of the Royal Society of Sciences in Uppsala